Ljupčo Markovski  (born 24 February 1967) is a Macedonian football manager and former player who played as a central defender. As of 2022–23 season, he is the coach of FK Rabotnički.

International career
He made his senior debut for Macedonia in an October 1993 friendly match away against Slovenia, which was his country's first ever official match, and has earned a total of 30 caps, scoring 1 goal. His final international was a June 1998 friendly match against Bosnia and Herzegovina.

Honours
As player:
FK Vardar
Macedonian Prva Liga:
Winner: 1992–93, 1993–94, 1994–95
Macedonian Cup:
Winner: 1992–93, 1994–95, 1997–98, 1998–99
Runner-up: 1995-96

As coach:
FK Rabotnicki
Macedonian Cup: 1
Winner: 2008–09

References

External links
 
 Ljupčo Markovski at MacedonianFootball.com 

1967 births
Living people
Footballers from Skopje
Association football central defenders
Yugoslav footballers
Macedonian footballers
North Macedonia international footballers
FK Vardar players
PFC CSKA Sofia players
Yugoslav First League players
Yugoslav Second League players
Macedonian First Football League players
First Professional Football League (Bulgaria) players
Macedonian expatriate footballers
Expatriate footballers in Bulgaria
Macedonian expatriate sportspeople in Bulgaria
Macedonian football managers
FK Skopje managers